The 2010 ECM Prague Open, also known as 2010 ECM Prague Open by Glanzis was a tennis tournament played on outdoor clay courts. It was the 9th edition of the ECM Prague Open, and was part of the WTA International tournaments of the 2010 WTA Tour. It took place in Prague, Czech Republic, from July 12 through July 18, 2010.

This was the last edition of ECM Prague Open due to financial distress.

WTA entrants

Seeds

Seedings are based on the rankings of July 5, 2010.

Other entrants
The following players received wildcards into the singles main draw
  Zarina Diyas
  Karolína Plíšková
  Kristýna Plíšková

The following players received entry from the qualifying draw:
  Catalina Castaño
  Mervana Jugić-Salkić
  Ksenia Pervak
  Liana Ungur

The following players received a lucky loser spot:
  Eva Hrdinová
  Tamira Paszek

Finals

Singles

 Ágnes Szávay defeated  Barbora Záhlavová-Strýcová, 6–2, 1–6, 6–2
It was Szávay's second title of the year and 5th of her career.

Doubles

 Timea Bacsinszky /  Tathiana Garbin defeated  Monica Niculescu /  Ágnes Szávay, 7–5, 7–6(7–4)

References

External links
Official website

ECM Prague Open
2010
2010 in Czech tennis